Dick Wright (25 July 1902 – 21 November 1961) was an  Australian rules footballer who played with North Melbourne in the Victorian Football League (VFL).

Notes

External links 

1902 births
1961 deaths
Australian rules footballers from Victoria (Australia)
North Melbourne Football Club players